Zizia is a genus of flowering plants in the parsley family, Apiaceae. It was named after Johann Baptist Ziz (1779–1829), a German botanist from the Rhineland. It is native to North America.

Like most other plants in the family, these produce umbels of flowers.

Species include:
Zizia aptera – heartleaf alexanders, meadowparsnip, meadow zizia   
Zizia aurea – golden alexanders, golden zizia   
Zizia trifoliata – meadow alexanders

References

External links 
USDA plant profile

 
Apioideae genera